The Rolls-Royce RB529 Contrafan was a high-thrust aircraft engine proposed by Rolls-Royce in the 1980s to power long-range wide-body airliners.

Development and design
The Contrafan was designed to power the four-engine Boeing 747 at a cruise speed of Mach 0.9. Like the General Electric Unducted Fan (UDF), the RB529 would have direct-drive contra-rotating fans in pusher configuration, and it would have variable pitch fan blades that were capable of reverse thrust. But a cowl would surround the fans of the engine, unlike the UDF.

The RB529 would have an engine core that was similar in size to the Rolls-Royce RB211-535E4, a  turbofan engine that was used to power the Boeing 757 narrow-body airliner.

Specifications

References

Bibliography

 
 
 
 

Rolls-Royce aircraft gas turbine engines